Windsor—Tecumseh is a federal  electoral district in Ontario, Canada, that has been represented in the House of Commons of Canada since 2004.

Geography

Windsor—Tecumseh consists of the Town of Tecumseh, and the part of the City of Windsor lying east and north of a line drawn from the U.S. border southeast along Langlois Avenue, east along Tecumseh Road East, and southeast along Pillette Road to the southern city limit.

History

Windsor—St. Clair was created in 1987 as "Windsor—Lake St. Clair" from parts of Essex—Windsor and Windsor—Walkerville ridings. In 1989, the riding's name was changed to "Windsor—St. Clair". It was also a provincial riding for the 1999 and 2003 Ontario provincial elections.

Windsor—Tecumseh was created in 2003 from parts of Essex and Windsor—St. Clair ridings.

This riding was left unchanged after the 2012 electoral redistribution.

Demographics
According to the Canada 2021 Census

Ethnic groups: 75.9% White, 5.4% Arab, 4.6% Black, 3.2% South Asian, 3.1% Aboriginal, 1.7% West Asian, 1.4% Filipino, 1.4% Latin American, 1.2% Chinese
Languages: 72.2% English, 4% Arabic, 2.6% French, 2.2% Serbo-Croatian, 1.8% Italian, 1.5% Chaldean Neo-Aramaic, 1.3% Serbian, 1.2% Spanish, 1% Polish
Religions: 65.1% Christian (39.6% Catholic, 4.3% Eastern Orthodox, 3.6% Anglican, 2.5% United Church, 1.4% Baptist, 1.4% Pentecostal and other Charismatic, 1% Presbyterian), 27.1 No religion, 4.6% Muslim, 1.3 Hindu 
Median income (2020): $40,400

Members of Parliament

Election results

Windsor—Tecumseh

|align="left" colspan=2|New Democratic Party hold
|align="right"|Swing
|align="right"| +2.74
|align="right"|

Windsor—St. Clair

|-

   

|-

|-

|-

Windsor—Lake St. Clair

|-
 
|New Democratic Party
|Howard McCurdy
|align="right"|18,915
|43.42
  
|Liberal
|Shaughnessy Cohen
|align="right"|16,192
|37.17
  
|Progressive Conservative
|Bruck Easton 
|align="right"|8,453    
|19.41

See also
 List of Canadian federal electoral districts
 Past Canadian electoral districts

References

Riding history from the Library of Parliament
2011 results from Elections Canada

Notes

Ontario federal electoral districts
Politics of Windsor, Ontario